Golden Lotus Awards are awarded at the Macau International Movie Festival and Macau International Television Festival. The awards are given annually and first awarded in 2009. The awards are given out by Macau Film and Television Media Association and China International Cultural Communication Center.

Awards categories

Film 
 Best Picture
 Best Director
 Best Writing
 Best Actor
 Best Actress
 Best Supporting Actor
 Best Supporting Actress
 Best Newcomer
 Best Cinematography
 Best Sound
 Best Documentary

Television
 Outstanding Television Drama
 Best Director
 Best Writing 
 Best Actor
 Best Actress
 Best Supporting Actor
 Best Supporting Actress
 Best Newcomer
 Outstanding Web Drama
 Best Producer
Source:

See also

List of Asian television awards

References

External links
 

Golden Lotus Awards
Macau film awards
Awards established in 2009
2009 establishments in China
Annual events in Macau